The Wensleydale Railway is a heritage railway in Wensleydale and Lower Swaledale in North Yorkshire, England. It was built in stages by different railway companies and originally extended to  railway station on the Settle-Carlisle line. Since 2003, the remaining line has been run as a heritage railway.

Additionally, a separate proposal exists to link Hawes to Garsdale with a view to providing commuter and tourist services rather than heritage services.

History
On 26 June 1846, an Act of Parliament authorised the Newcastle & Darlington Junction Railway, and its successor the York, Newcastle and Berwick Railway, to build a line between Northallerton and Bedale. The  section between Northallerton and Leeming Lane opened on 6 March 1848. The section between Leeming Bar and Bedale that was authorised by the Act was not built, due to the collapse of George Hudson's railway interests. This left the railway to terminate just west of the Great North Road in Leeming Bar, with passengers for Bedale being conveyed on the last section by horse and cart.

The Bedale and Leyburn Railway, financed by local landowners, was an  extension between Leeming Bar and Leyburn that was authorised on 4 August 1853; the section between Leeming Bar and Bedale station opened on 1 February 1855 and the remainder on 28 November 1855 for goods and minerals and 19 May 1856 for passengers. The York, Newcastle and Berwick had become a founder member of the North Eastern Railway (NER) on 31 July 1854, and the Bedale and Leyburn was absorbed into this larger company in 1859.

The Liverpool, Manchester and Newcastle upon Tyne Junction Railway had been proposed in the mid-1840s railway mania to link Settle, Hawes and Askrigg, and in 1846 the Liverpool, Manchester and Newcastle upon Tyne Junction Railway was given permission for a main line from Elslack, on the Leeds and Bradford Railway, to Scorton on the Richmond branch of the Great North of England Railway, and a branch line to Hawes, but this scheme failed.

In the late 1860s, several competing railways proposed to serve the agricultural land around Hawes. Eventually, an Act of Parliament raised by the Midland Railway that mostly related to the Settle and Carlisle line but included a branch off this line between Garsdale and Hawes was authorised on 16 July 1866. An Act of Parliament raised by the North Eastern Railway for a railway between Leyburn and Hawes was authorised on 4 July 1870, though work did not start until 1874. The section of this railway between Leyburn and Askrigg opened on 1 February 1877; the section between Askrigg and Hawes was opened for goods on 1 June 1878. The Hawes branch of the Settle and Carlisle line was opened for goods on 1 August 1878; the sections between Askrigg and Hawes and between Hawes and Garsdale were both opened for passengers on 1 October 1878. The delays in the section between Hawes Junction and Hawes was down to the heavier engineering required on this section (one tunnel and two viaducts) with steeper gradients. In the months before the section opened, a landslip at Mossdale required extra work to excavate from the line.

At this point, there was a through route between Northallerton and Garsdale. Both companies had running powers over each others' lines; the NER ran passenger trains westwards from Hawes (but no freight) and the Midland only exercised their right to run trains eastwards to Leyburn with occasional excursion traffic.

Rationalisation
The line remained a single track branch line, except for the double track section between Leeming Bar and Bedale. Chief commodities transported on the line were coal, milk, and stone. One passenger train each way was operated between Garsdale and Hawes until 14 March 1959 at which point this part of the line closed to all traffic, however, freight continued from Northallerton to Hawes until 1964. On 27 April 1964, the line between Redmire and Hawes closed completely. The track west of Redmire was lifted and many bridges on this section of the line were demolished in 1965. Most freight traffic on the line ceased in 1982, with the exception of the limestone traffic from Redmire to Teesside for steel-making, though this freight flow ceased in December 1992 when British Steel switched its limestone source to Hardendale in Cumbria. As a result of the removal of all but the one daily train, Leyburn loop and signal box were closed.  Some excursion tours ran to Redmire in the 1970s, 1980s and early 1990s particularly the DalesRail services in 1977 which prompted interest in a renewed passenger service on the line.

Services
At the opening of the railway to Leyburn in 1856, services consisted of either five or six return journeys. With the eventual opening of the line by 1878, the NER rans five trains per day between Northallerton and Garsdale, with the Midland Railway running an additional daily return train from Hellifield to Hawes, known colloquially as Bonnyface. In the 1880s, the Midland Railway ran two stopping passengers trains on the Settle-Carlisle Line, which would connect with the NER local trains to Northallerton from Hawes Junction (Garsdale). The Midland (and later the LMS) ran a second early morning train to Hawes on a Tuesday only, this was the day of the cattle market in Hawes. The 1896 timetable shows five workings from Northallerton to Hawes, four of which continued on to Hawes Junction. The return number down the valley towards Northallerton was the same; five in total, with four originating at Hawes Junction.

In 1914, services amounted to five daily return trips on the full length of the line. A further two trains went part way; Northallerton to Bedale arriving at 10:07 am, and Northallerton to Leyburn, arriving at 11:47 pm. In the other direction, the two extra trains were Leyburn to Northallerton leaving at 6:10 am and Hawes to Northallerton leaving at 9:05 am. By 1939, three trains ran the full length of the line in both directions, with two extra services either terminating, or starting from Leyburn and Hawes. By 1942, only two trains ran the whole length of the line, but the third service was reinstated by 1950.

After services ceased running eastwards from Hawes in 1954, the Bonnyface became a once-daily train connecting Hawes with Hellifield.

Restoration

 
 

The Wensleydale Railway Association (WRA) was formed in 1990 with the main aim of restoring passenger services. When British Rail decided to try to sell the line between Northallerton and Redmire following cessation of the quarry trains to Redmire, the WRA decided to take a more proactive role and aimed to operate passenger services itself. The Ministry of Defence (MoD) had an interest in using the line between Northallerton and Redmire to transport armoured vehicles to/from Catterick Garrison. The MoD paid for repairs and restoration of the line and the installation of loading facilities at Redmire, and did not object to WRC taking over the line. A trial train ran in November 1993 and full MoD operations started in July 1996. These military transport trains continue to this day.

In 2000, WRA formed a separate operating company, the Wensleydale Railway plc (WRC), and issued a share offer to raise funds. £1.2 million was raised through this method. Railtrack agreed to lease the line between Northallerton and Redmire to WRC and a 99-year lease was signed in 2003. Passenger services restarted on 4 July 2003 with the stations at Leeming Bar and Leyburn being reopened. In 2004, the stations at Bedale, Finghall and Redmire were reopened. A passing loop was opened at the site of the former Constable Burton station, which enabled the railway to introduce a 2-train service when required.

It is hoped to recommence services at a future date once work to upgrade level crossing equipment is complete.

In 2016, it was reported that the railway carries over 50,000 people a year and that for every £1 spent on the railway, £4 is spent at one of the towns or villages on the route.

A study commissioned by the railway indicated that an initial extension to Aysgarth from Redmire, would generate an extra income of £3.1 million per year into the local economy with an additional £500,000 in annual ticket sales for the railway. This has been costed at £2 million and is listed in a five-year plan. In order to achieve this, the missing bridge that used to span Apedale Beck to the west of Redmire station will need to be replaced. There was a plan to do so utilising a redundant bridge from the Catterick branch line that was removed during the A1 to A1(M) upgrade in 2015 and stored in Redmire Station car park. However the bridge was subsequently found to be unsuitable and it has been cut up and removed.

In January 2019, Campaign for Better Transport released a report identifying the line which was listed as Priority 2 for reopening. Priority 2 is for those lines which require further development or a change in circumstances (such as housing developments).

Upper Wensleydale Railway
The group's objective is to have a timetabled year-round service run by a train operating company, rather than a heritage service. This scheme was shortlisted for funding in the second round of the government's Reverse Beeching Fund, in June 2020.

Company structure

The Wensleydale Railway plc is responsible for the operation, maintenance and development of the railway line and passenger services. The company has a mixture of employed and volunteer staff.

The Wensleydale Railway Association (Trust) Ltd is a membership organisation and a registered charity that supports the development of the railway through fund raising, volunteer working, providing training and supporting work on heritage structures such as Scruton station and Bedale signal box.

Locomotives

Class 9F No. 92219 was removed from the railway in December 2020 to a private site in Tebay. Other locos were also moved from the Wensleydale Railway at the same time due to the railway being overcrowded and needing space to operate.

Both 20169 and 37674, were moved from the Wensleydale Railway in December 2020.

Previously stored or unused locomotives, numbers No. 25313 (D7663), No. 31454, No. 37503 (D6717), No. 60086, and No. 60050 were all cleared from the railway in spring 2021.

Diesel Multiple Units (DMUs)
BR Class 142 No. 142018, to be returned to Chocolate and Cream livery
BR Class 142 No. 142028
BR Class 142 No. 142041
BR Class 142 No. 142060
BR Class 142 No. 142078, stored
BR Class 142 No. 142087, stored
BR Class 142 No. 142090, stored
BR Class 142 No. 142094, stored
BR Class 144 No. 144020 (awaiting activation)

In the autumn of 2020, BR Class 144 Nos. 144004 and 144016, were temporarily stored at the railway, awaiting onward transport by road to the Aln Valley Railway. They departed the Wensleydale Railway in December 2020.

Incidents
15 February 1867 – two trains collided on a single line section west of Newton-le-Willows station. The westbound train was in the process of moving forward to reverse shunt into the siding to allow the eastbound train to enter the station. Both trains were signalled onto the single line section at the same time and so collided head-on. Injuries were only to passengers in the eastbound train. An inquiry recommended that a passing loop and a second platform be installed.
24 December 1894 – the ex-Hawes goods train was shunting the yard at Bedale when a heavy goods train arriving from Darlington collided with it. One of the wagons went down an embankment, but there were no injuries. However, passengers had to detrain and walk through the station to rejoin trains on either side of the accident to continue their journeys.
6 December 1900, a landslip north of Bedale Signal Box, derailed a train so that it ended up in Bedale Beck. The fireman was scalded badly and taken to Northallerton Cottage Hospital, where he later died.
30 June 2011 – a tractor was hit by a train on Flood Bridge user-worked crossing (UWC).
No injuries were reported.
The above two accidents required the heritage railway to update and improve its safety management practices.
20 October 2012 – a car was hit by a locomotive on Fox Park level crossing.
30 January 2013 – a car was struck by a train at Aiskew level crossing, which took the A684 road over the railway (the A684 has bypassed this road since 2014).
3 August 2016 – a heritage train heading west from Northallerton West railway station, struck a car on the level crossing near to the village of Yafforth. The lights and audible alarms were determined to have been in good working order. The car driver and two passengers on the train were injured.

Notes

References

Sources

External links

 Wensleydale Railway website
 Upper Wensleydale Railway website

Video and commentary on Northallerton West railway station
YouTube Video of Scruton Railway Station
Video and commentary – Garsdale railway station, once the junction for the Wensleydale line.
YouTube video of Redmire Railway Station.

Heritage railways in Yorkshire
Tourist attractions in North Yorkshire
Wensleydale
Railway lines opened in 1878
Railway companies established in 2000